The Missouri United Methodist Church is a United Methodist church in downtown Columbia, Missouri. Its congregation formed the first Methodist Church in Columbia in 1837. The present building on 9th Street built between 1925 and 1930 is constructed out of Indiana Bedford limestone in a Late Gothic Revival style. The Stained Glass windows, including the large History of Methodism window at the rear of the sanctuary, are some of the most detailed in Mid-Missouri. The sanctuary seats 1,000 people. It was added to the National Register of Historic Places in 1980.

Music
The Missouri United Methodist Church has a long music tradition.  It has a large Skinner pipe organ (1928, Opus 750) acquired by University of Missouri School of Music Dean James Thomas Quarles.  The Church hosts an annual Missouri United Church Concert Series featuring the Columbia Chorale, the 9th Street Philharmonic Orchestra as well as other well-known groups such as Chanticleer and the Vienna Boys Choir.

Bibliography

References

External links
Missouri United Methodist Church

Churches on the National Register of Historic Places in Missouri
Gothic Revival church buildings in Missouri
Churches completed in 1930
Churches in Columbia, Missouri
National Register of Historic Places in Columbia, Missouri
Music venues in Columbia, Missouri
United Methodist churches in Missouri
National Register of Historic Places in Boone County, Missouri